The vice president of the Republic of Indonesia is the second-highest officer in the executive branch of the Indonesian government, after the president, and ranks first in the presidential line of succession. Since 2004, the president and vice president are directly elected to a five-year term.

The vice presidency was established during the formulation of the 1945 Constitution by the Investigating Committee for Preparatory Work for Independence (BPUPK), a research body for the preparation of Indonesian independence. On 18 August 1945, the Preparatory Committee for Indonesian Independence (PPKI), which was created on 7 August to replace the BPUPK, selected Sukarno as the country's first president and Mohammad Hatta as vice president.

Vice presidents

By age

<div style="overflow:auto">

Notes

By time in office

Notes

Footnotes
  Hatta announced his resignation from office on 26 July 1956, effective on 1 December 1956 and legitimized retroactively on 5 February 1957.
  President Sukarno did not name Hatta's successor as vice president. In December 1965, there were calls for a vice president to be named to assist Sukarno with the fallout of the 30 September Movement and General Suharto's attempts to take over the government. It was not until the New Order regime of President Suharto that the vice president post became filled again.
  Vice President Hamengkubuwono IX rejected his nomination for Vice President by the People's Consultative Assembly (MPR) in March 1978, due to poor health.
  Following the 1997 Asian financial crisis, there were calls for Suharto's resignation as president. On 21 May 1998, Suharto resigned from office. Habibie became his successor as the President of Indonesia.
  After Abdurrahman Wahid was impeached by the MPR, Vice President Megawati replaced him as President of Indonesia.

See also

 President of Indonesia
 List of presidents of Indonesia
 Vice President of Indonesia

References
Specific

General
 .
 .
 .
 .
 .
 .

Vice-Presidents of Indonesia

Indonesia